"Dodonuts" is an episode of the British comedy television series The Goodies.

Written by The Goodies, with songs and music by Bill Oddie.

Plot
Bill is upset when he discovers that Tim and Graeme have become overobsessive hunters.  Tim and Graeme belong to the Endangered Species Club.  They are especially interested in hunting endangered species and non-endangered species like farm animals, urban animals, local animals and domestic animals because the small numbers make them hard to find.  On the other hand, Tim and Graeme consider that common species animals and birds are too abundant and therefore far too easy to hunt.

Later, Graeme finds a dodo (the last one in existence) in a pet shop, and brings it home to Bill, who then has to keep the bird safe from the other two.  Tim asks Graeme about the price of the dodo: "Was it going cheap?"  "No," said Graeme, "it was going ERRRRKKKK!!!"

When Bill teaches the dodo how to fly (for the dodo's own protection), the method of flight is rather unusual for a bird.

References

 "The Complete Goodies" — Robert Ross, B T Batsford, London, 2000
 "The Goodies Rule OK" — Robert Ross, Carlton Books Ltd, Sydney, 2006
 "From Fringe to Flying Circus — 'Celebrating a Unique Generation of Comedy 1960-1980'" — Roger Wilmut, Eyre Methuen Ltd, 1980
 "The Goodies Episode Summaries" — Brett Allender
 "The Goodies — Fact File" — Matthew K. Sharp

External links

The Goodies (series 7) episodes
1977 British television episodes
Dodo